The Charles Clinton Stone Row House is a stone row house located at 151 Central Street in Tonopah, Nevada, United States. Charles Clinton built the house in 1905 to use as a boarding house. The building's plan, designed to fit a narrow plot of land, features a series of rooms connected by an inside corridor. The house was built in ashlar stone and is topped by a hipped roof. After its use as a boarding house, the building served as a hospital.

The building was added to the National Register of Historic Places on May 20, 1982.

References

Houses completed in 1905
Houses on the National Register of Historic Places in Nevada
National Register of Historic Places in Tonopah, Nevada
Houses in Nye County, Nevada
1905 establishments in Nevada